Football Club LNZ Cherkasy is a Ukrainian professional football club based in Cherkasy. The club is owned by LNZ Group.

History 
The club was created in 2006 by Dmytro Kravchenko. The club was based at the time in the city of Shpola and played at its Central Stadium.

Until 2013 the club was known as FC Shpola-LNZ-Lebedyn.

Honours 
 Ukrainian Amateur Cup
  Winners (2): 2017–18, 2020–21
 Cherkasy Oblast Championship
  Winners (4): 2009, 2011, 2016, 2017
  Runners-up (2): 2007, 2012
 Cherkasy Oblast Cup
  Runners-up (2): 2009, 2012

Current squad

Out on loan

Head coaches 
 2006–2011 Petro Slavinskyi
 2012–2020 Vasyl Hrechanyi
 2020–2022 Yuriy Bakalov
 2022-present Oleksandr Kovpak

See also
 FC Viktoriya Mykolaivka

References

External links 
 LNZ-Lebedyn: Quarterfinal perspectives, regional triumph and new stadium for your homeland ("ЛНЗ-Лебедин": чвертьфінальні перспективи, обласний тріумф та новий стадіон для краю). Footboom. 10 March 2018 (interview with Vasyl Hrechanyi)

 
Association football clubs established in 2006
2006 establishments in Ukraine
Football clubs in Cherkasy Oblast
Ukrainian First League clubs